The adductor tubercle is a tubercle on the lower extremity of the femur. It is formed where the medial lips of the linea aspera end below at the summit of the medial condyle. It is the insertion point of the tendon of the vertical fibers of the adductor magnus muscle.

References

External links
 
 Diagram at gla.ac.uk

Bones of the lower limb
Femur